Dashlujeh (also Romanized as Dāshlūjeh) is a village in Bozkosh Rural District, in the Central District of Ahar County, East Azerbaijan Province, Iran. At the 2006 census, its population was 107, in 25 families.

References 

Populated places in Ahar County